Tito Manlio (RV 738) is an opera in three acts by Antonio Vivaldi, to a libretto by Matteo Noris. It was written in celebration of the marriage of Philip of Hesse-Darmstadt (1671–1736), the governor of Mantua, which he had announced at Christmas. Vivaldi quickly composed the opera within five days. Whereas the wedding eventually did not take place at all, the opera was successfully premiered at the Teatro Arciducale ‘detto il Comico’ in Mantua during the carnival season of 1719.

Roles

Synopsis
The opera is about the story of Titus Manlius Torquatus, consul of Rome and the conflict between him and the region of Latium.

Recordings

• 1978 — Giancarlo Luccardi (Tito Manlio), Rose Wagemann (Manlio), Julia Hamari (Servilia), Birgit Finnilä (Vitellia), Margaret Marshall (Lucio), Domenico Trimarchi (Lindo), Norma Lerer (Decio), Claes H. Ahnsjö (Geminio) — Rundfunkchor Berlin, Berlin Chamber Orchestra, Vittorio Negri — 4 CD Philips Classics Records (recorded in 1978, remastered in 1990 on CD, it's regarded as the complete reference recording and was included in the Philips Vivaldi Edition)

References

External links
 Opera Today: Tito Manlio
 Libretto

Operas
1719 operas
Operas by Antonio Vivaldi
Italian-language operas